Antigua and Barbuda's transport systems include both public and privately run services. Roads in the country are paved and follow a winding and gently sloping course connecting parishes to villages and communities. Driving is on the left-hand side.

Public transportation vehicles contain the letters "BUS" for buses or "TX" for taxis on their yellow licence plates.  The government regulates taxi service, setting fixed fares rather than using a metered system.  Taxi cabs are supposed to keep a copy of the rates inside the vehicle.  On Antigua, taxis are easily found, particularly at the airport and at major hotels.  Many taxi drivers also will act as tour guides.

Buses operate from 5:30 a.m. to 6:00 p.m. daily on Antigua, running between the capital city, St. John's, and various villages.  However, buses do not stop at the airport or the northern tourist area.  Although departure times are often left up to the driver, buses generally follow a set schedule.  Most buses have their routes posted in the front windows, and they're usually privately owned mini-vans seating about 15 people.  St. John's has two bus stations, the East Bus Station near the Botanical Gardens on Independence Ave and another one on Market St. near the Central Market.  Several buses are also available on Barbuda.

West Bus Station Routes
12 - Valley Rd, Joseph's Lane, All Saints Road, Belmont, Clarks Hill, Sea View Farm, Freemans Village.
13 - Valley Rd, Joseph's Lane, All Saints Road, Belmont, Buckleys, Swetes Village, John Hughes.
29 - Valley Rd, Joseph's Lane, All Saints Road, Belmont, Herberts.
42 - Valley Rd, Vivian Richards Street, Independence Drive, Factory Road, East Bus Station, Hailes Promenade, Factory Road, Airport Road, Coolidge, Free Trade Zone.
54 - Valley Rd, Vivian Richards Street, Independence Drive, Bishopgate Street, Cross Street, Friars Hill Road, Woods Mall.
15 - Valley Rd, Joseph's Lane, All Saints Road, Belmont, Clarks Hill, All Saints Village, Liberta Village, terminating at Horsford Hill.
17 - Valley Rd, Joseph's Lane, All Saints Road, Belmont, Clarks Hill, All Saints Village, Liberta Village, Falmouth, Cobbs Cross, English Harbour.
22 - Valley Road, Golden Grove, Big Creek, Ebenezer, Jennings, Bolans, Crabb Hill, Johnson Point, Urlings, Old Road.
50 - Valley Rd, Vivian Richards Street, Independence Drive, Bishopgate Street, Cross Street, Dickenson Bay Street, Villa, Yorks.
20 -  Valley Road, Golden Grove, Big Creek, Ebenezer, Jennings, Bolans.
10 -  Valley Rd, Joseph's Lane, All Saints Road, Bendals.
61 1 Valley Road, Federation Road, Gray's Farm. Greenbay, Five Islands.

Tourists are allowed to rent cars, provided they have a valid driver's license from their home country.  They must first purchase a temporary driver's licence, which can often be arranged through rental agencies.

Several ports and harbours provide docking for cruise ships, sailboats, yachts, and other boats.  All boats are required to enter in Antigua before continuing to Barbuda, and they must obtain a permit from the Port Authority to do so.  Fees apply both for entering and docking in the country.  The main port is at St. John's, receiving cruise ships and the Barbuda Express.  The Barbuda Express travels between St. John's and Barbuda five days a week.  Cruise ships also dock at Heritage Quay.  English Harbour, the site of Nelson's Dockyard, began as an important port on Antigua centuries ago. Other ports and harbours include Jolly Harbour, Deepwater Harbour, High Point Crabbs Peninsula, and Codrington (Barbuda).

Airports

The country's major airport is V. C. Bird International Airport, which serves both international and local carriers.  Located near St. John's on Antigua's northern coast, all commercial flights to the country first enter at this airport.  With its recently built terminal building, constructed in 1981, its facilities are better than many airports in the Caribbean.  After arriving at the airport, travellers can take chartered flights or boats to Barbuda or other Caribbean destinations.

Merchant Marine
Total: 964 (2017)
By type: bulk carrier 36, container ship 238, general cargo 615, oil tanker 2, other 73 (CIA World Factbook 2017)

Statistics

Railways
There were formerly around 80 km of narrowgauge railways for sugarcane plantations. These are no longer used.

Roads
total:
1,165 km (2002)
country comparison to the world: 182
paved:
384 km
unpaved:
781 km

Ports and harbours
Saint John's Victor en Virginia and en Videoshop

Airports
3 (2008)
country comparison to the world: 191

Airports - with paved runways:total:2
2,438 to 3,047 m:
1
under 914 m:
1 (2008)

Airports - with unpaved runways:
total:
1
under 914 m:
1 (2008)

See also
Antigua and Barbuda
History of Antigua and Barbuda
Economy of Antigua and Barbuda

References

This article contains information from the CIA World Factbook 2009.